The Chestnut Street station was a station on the demolished BMT Fulton Street Line in Brooklyn, New York City. It had 2 tracks and 2 side platforms. It was served by trains of the BMT Fulton Street Line. The station was opened on July 16, 1894, and is one of three stations to extend the Fulton Street Line closer to Queens. The next stop to the east was Crescent Street. The next stop to the west was Montauk Avenue. On November 28, 1948, the Independent Subway System opened the underground Euclid Avenue Subway station two blocks east after years of war-time construction delays. This station rendered both Chestnut Street station and the nearby Crescent Street station obsolete, and it closed on April 26, 1956.

References

External links
Chestnut Street Elevated Station; BMT Fulton Street Line (NYCSubway.org)

Defunct BMT Fulton Street Line stations
Railway stations in the United States opened in 1894
Railway stations closed in 1956
Former elevated and subway stations in Brooklyn